is a 1955 Japanese drama film directed by Mikio Naruse. It is based on the novel of the same name by Japanese writer Fumiko Hayashi, published just before her death in 1951. The film received numerous national awards upon its release and remains one of director Naruse's most acclaimed works.

Plot
The film follows Yukiko, a woman who has just been expatriated from French Indochina, where she has been working as a secretary for a forestry project of the Japanese wartime government. Yukiko seeks out Kengo, one of the engineers of the project, with whom she had an affair and who had promised to divorce his wife for her. They renew their affair, but Kengo tells Yukiko he is unable to leave his wife. Yukiko can't cut ties with Kengo, although he even starts an affair with a married younger woman, while she becomes the mistress of an American soldier as a means to survive in times of economic restraint. Eventually, she follows Kengo to an island where he has taken a new job, where she dies of her bad health and the humid climate.

Cast

 Hideko Takamine as Yukiko Koda
 Masayuki Mori as Kengo Tomioka
 Mariko Okada as Sei Mukai
 Chieko Nakakita as Kuniko Tomioka
 Daisuke Katō as Seikichi Mukai
 Isao Yamagata as Sugio Iba
 Mayuri Mokusho as Nomiya no musume
 Noriko Sengoku as a lady of Yakushima
 Fuyuki Murakami as Makita
 Heihachiro Okawa as Dr. Higa
 Nobuo Kaneko as Kanō
 Roy James as American soldier
 Akira Tani as a believer

Awards and legacy
 1956 – Blue Ribbon Awards for best film (Mikio Naruse)
 1956 – Kinema Junpo Award for best actor (Masayuki Mori), for best actress (Hideko Takamine), for best director (Mikio Naruse) and for best film (Mikio Naruse)
 1956 – Mainichi Film Concours for best actress (Hideko Takamine), for best director (Mikio Naruse), for best film (Mikio Naruse) and for best sound recording (Hisashi Shimonaga)

Yasujirō Ozu saw Floating Clouds in 1955, and called it "a real masterpiece" in his journals. The film is Naruse's most popular film in Japan. It was voted the second best Japanese film of all time in a poll of 140 Japanese critics and filmmakers conducted by the magazine Kinema Junpo in 1999. It also received 10 votes total in the British Film Institute's 2012 Sight & Sound critics' and directors' polls.

The Japanese filmmaker Akira Kurosawa cited this movie as one of his 100 favorite films.

Analysis
Adrian Martin, editor of on-line film journal Rouge,  has remarked upon Naruse's cinema of walking.  Bertrand Tavernier, speaking of Naruse's Sound of the Mountain, described how the director minutely describes each journey and that "such comings and goings represent uncertain yet reassuring transitions: they are a way of taking stock, of defining a feeling".  So in Floating Clouds, the walks down streets "are journeys of the everyday, where time is measured out of footfalls, – and where even the most melodramatic blow or the most ecstatic moment of pleasure cannot truly take the characters out of the unromantic, unsentimental forward progression of their existences."

The Australian scholar Freda Freiberg has remarked on the terrain of the film: "The frustrations and moroseness of the lovers in Floating Clouds are directly linked to and embedded in the depressed and demoralised social and economic conditions of early post-war Japan; the bombed-out cities, the shortage of food and housing, the ignominy of national defeat and foreign occupation, the economic temptation of prostitution with American military personnel."

References

External links
 
 

1955 films
1955 drama films
Japanese drama films
Japanese black-and-white films
Films based on works by Fumiko Hayashi
Best Film Kinema Junpo Award winners
Films directed by Mikio Naruse
Films produced by Sanezumi Fujimoto
Films scored by Ichirō Saitō
Toho films
1950s Japanese films